The 2021 Sydney Roosters season is the 114th in the club's history and they are competing in the 2021 NRL season. The team is coached by Trent Robinson, coaching the club for his 9th consecutive season. Jake Friend started the season as club captain for the 7th consecutive season, however, was forced into medical retirement on 8 April 2021 due to multiple head-knocks. He was replaced by James Tedesco in his first season as captain.

2021 Squad

Transfers

Source:

2021 Gains

2021 Losses

References

2021
Sydney Roosters season
2021 NRL Women's season